Cebolla is a Spanish municipality of Toledo province, in the autonomous community of Castile-La Mancha. Its population is 2,978 and it is 37 km², in area with a density of 80.5 people/km².

The mayor of Cebolla is Jesús Malta García, of the Partido Socialista Obrero Español. The Partido Socialista Obrero Español has 7 municipal councillors and the Partido Popular has 4. In the 2004 Spanish General Election the Partido Socialista Obrero Español got 52.8% of the vote in Cebolla, the Partido Popular got 43.5% and Izquierda Unida got 2.1%.

References

Municipalities in the Province of Toledo